Borowice may refer to the following places in Poland:
Borowice, Lower Silesian Voivodeship (south-west Poland)
Borowice, Masovian Voivodeship (east-central Poland)
Borowice, West Pomeranian Voivodeship (north-west Poland)